Giandomenico Picco, AKA Gianni Picco, born 1948, is an Italian diplomat and former United Nations Assistant Secretary-General for Political Affairs, who negotiated the release of 11 hostages held by terrorists in Lebanon, earning him the epithets "chief troubleshooter" and "unarmed soldier of diplomacy" from United Nations Secretary-General Perez de Cuellar.

Background

Giandomenico Picco was born on October 8, 1948, in Italy.  He studied at the Liceo Classico Jacopo Stellini in Udine, Italy, BA in political science at the University of Padua, MA in international relations and comparative politics at the University of California at Santa Barbara (via the U.S.-Italy Fulbright Commission), the University of Prague, and a diploma in European integration studies at the University of Amsterdam.

Career

United Nations

Picco joined the United Nations in 1973 and served there until 1992.

In 1976, Picco began working with Perez de Cuellar in Cyprus, where Picco was serving as political affairs officer to the United Nations Force in Cyprus who reported to its head, de Cuellar.

In 1986, Picco represented de Cuellar (who had succeeded Kurt Waldheim as UN Secretary-General) in negotiations between France and New Zealand over the sinking of the Greenpeace ship Rainbow Warrior.

Picco's efforts were extremely sensitive:  "His trips are often shrouded in mystery, and United Nations officials have tried to keep his current movements even more secret."  Often, the only news of his whereabouts or activities were "on mission."  Perez de Cuellar was known to deny Picco's involvement in some active hostage negotiation, while journalists might happen to sight him in places like Damascus, Syria.

Peace Negotiations

Picco led or participated in peace negotiations including:
 1987:  Cease-fire in the Iran-Iraq War
 1988:  Geneva agreements leading to Soviet withdrawal from Afghanistan

Hostage Negotiations

Picco served as de Cuellar's personal representative to negotiate release of hostages. and may have instigated them.  Among those with whom Picco negotiated was Mohammad Javad Zarif.

Picco led hostage negotiations including:  
 1989-1992:  Release of 11 hostages during the Lebanon hostage crisis including Anglican reverend Terry Waite, AP bureau chief Terry A. Anderson, Edward Austin Tracy, and John McCarthy (journalist) from the Shi'ite militia Revolutionary Justice Organization

 1999: Release of 13 Jews arrested in Shiraz, Iran, and charged with espionage. At the request of American Jewish leaders, Picco intervened with Iranian President Khatami and succeeded in obtaining the release of all prisoners.

(Among hostages Picco could not save were American soldiers William Francis Buckley and William R. Higgins.)

Private negotiations

In 1992, Picco left the UN.  In 1994, he formed the international consulting firm GDP Associates for business negotiations, based in New York City.  He also became president of the Peace Strategies Project, based in Geneva, Switzerland, and US Equity Partners Holdings, LLC.  He has served as director of Levcor International, Inc., and the Carlyle Group.

The Pio Manzù International Research Centre's International Scientific Committee included Picco as vice president and Mikhail Gorbachev.  On their behalf, he presented an award to Diana, Princess of Wales.

He has also spoken to the World Affairs Seminar and gave a keynote address to the Institute for Cultural Diplomacy in 2017.

Dialogue Among Civilizations
See Dialogue Among Civilizations

In 1999, UN Secretary General Kofi Annan appointed Picco as Personal Representative for the UN Year of Dialogue Among Civilizations, proclaimed in 1998.  Members included Chinese philosopher Tu Weiming.

Personal life

Picco has married twice, first to Elena Carretta Toth and second wife to Kate Glucksman.

Picco has served on the Ambassador's Council of the United Nation's Association/USA, the European-American Chamber of Commerce, and the International Peace Academy.

Awards

On December 12, 1991, US President George H. W. Bush presented the resenting the Medal of Freedom to de Cuellar and the Presidential Award for Exceptional Service to Picco, while welcoming home American hostages Thomas Sutherland, Alann Steen, Jesse Turner, Joseph Cicippio, and Terry Anderson.  Of Picco, President Bush said, "In his years as Special Envoy at the United Nations, Assistant Secretary-General Gianni Picco has sought always to serve peace and to resolve conflict."
 1991:  Presidential Award for Exceptional Service (United States of America)
 1993:  Order of St. Michael and St. George (United Kingdom)
 1992:  Order of Merit (Federal Republic of Germany)
 1993:  National Order of the Cedar (Lebanese Republic)
 1993:  Order of Grande Ufficiale della Repubblica (Italy)
 1994:  Honorary Doctorate of Human Letters, Marywood University

Works

Picco's principal work, Man Without a Gun (1999), aided by Argus Media's editor-in-chief Diane Munro, received favorable reviews. Kirkus wrote, "A must-read for anyone who wants to know what the UN really does." Publishers Weekly wrote, "This memoir of an extraordinary career reads like a combination of a thriller and a textbook on the delicate and dangerous art of diplomacy in an often explosive region."

The documentary film Dawn at Midnight (2014) by Cetywa Powell draws in part from Picco's memoir Man Without a Gun (1999).

Books (English)
 Lessons of the Iran-Iraq War (1990)
 International Solidarity and National Sovereignty (Giovanni Delli Zotti, co-editor) (1995)
 Man Without a Gun (1999)
 Crossing the Divide:  Dialogue Among Civilizations editor/contributor with others (2001)
 The Fog of Peace with Gabriel Rifkind (2013)

Books (Italian)
 I labirinti del presente with Antonio Torrenzano (2004)

Articles
 "The UN and the Use of Force: Leave the Secretary General Out of It," Foreign Affairs (September/October 1976)
 "A New Afghanistan in a New International Construct," Carnegie Council's U.S. Global Engagement Initiative (USGE) (2014)

Interviews from the United Nations
 1998.09.23: Giandomenico Picco, Director of the UN Office for Special Political Affairs
 1990.05.24: Giandomenico Picco, Director and Assistant to the UN Secretary-General for Special Assignments
 1991.12.06: Giandomenico Picco, UN Assistant Secretary-General
 2000.04.20: Giandomenico Picco, Personal Representative of the Secretary-General to the United Nations Year of Dialogue Among Civilizations

See also
 Lebanon hostage crisis
 Dialogue Among Civilizations
 Rainbow Warrior (1955)
 United Nations
 Perez de Cuellar

References

External links
 C-SPAN:  Giandomenico Picco
 BBC Witness History:  Audio interview with "Giandomenico Picco - Hostage Negotiator"
 Washington Post:  "The U.S. and Iran" (transcript)

People from Lima
Italian officials of the United Nations
Italian diplomats
Italian democracy activists
1948 births
Living people